The Zambezian region is a large biogeographical region in Africa. The Zambezian region includes woodlands, savannas, grasslands, and thickets, extending from east to west in a broad belt across the continent. The Zambezian region lies south of the rainforests of the Guineo-Congolian region. The Zambezian region is bounded by deserts and xeric shrublands on the southwest, the Highveld grasslands of South Africa to the south, and the subtropical Maputaland forests on the southeast.

Vegetation types
The dominant vegetation types in the Zambezian region include: 
 Dry deciduous forest and scrub forest
 Zambezian wooded grassland
 Itigi deciduous thicket
 Miombo woodland
 Mopane woodland
 Undifferentiated woodland
 Zambezian flooded grasslands and savannas
 Zambezian halophytics

Biodiversity
Botanist Frank White estimated that the region has 8,500 species of plants, of which 4,590, or 54%, are endemic. The Zambezian region is a centre of diversity for tree species in the genera Brachystegia and Monotes.

Ecoregions
According to the World Wildlife Fund, the Zambezian region includes over a dozen ecoregions.

 Angolan miombo woodlands (Angola)
 Angolan mopane woodlands (Angola, Namibia)
 Bushveld (South Africa, Botswana, Zimbabwe)
 Central Zambezian miombo woodlands (Angola, Burundi, Democratic Republic of the Congo, Malawi, Tanzania, Zambia)
 Eastern miombo woodlands (Mozambique, Tanzania)
 Etosha Pan halophytics (Namibia)
 Itigi-Sumbu thicket (Tanzania, Zambia)
 Southern miombo woodlands (Malawi, Mozambique, Zambia, Zimbabwe)
 Western Zambezian grasslands (Angola, Zambia)
 Zambezian Baikiaea woodlands (Angola, Botswana, Namibia, Zambia, Zimbabwe)
 Zambezian Cryptosepalum dry forests (Angola, Zambia)
 Zambezian coastal flooded savanna	(Mozambique)
 Zambezian flooded grasslands (Angola, Botswana, Democratic Republic of the Congo, Malawi, Mozambique, Tanzania, Zambia)
 Zambezian halophytics (Botswana, Mozambique)
 Zambezian and mopane woodlands (Botswana, Eswatini, Malawi, Mozambique, Namibia, South Africa, Zambia, Zimbabwe)

References

 
Afrotropical realm
Floristic regions